12 Aurigae is a Be star in the northern constellation Auriga. It lies below the normal limit for visibility to the naked eye, having an apparent visual magnitude of 6.988. It lacks a designation from the Hipparcos catalogue.  It is located just under half a degree north of Capella.

Assigned spectral classes for 12 Aurigae vary greatly from B2 to B5 and the luminosity class from V (main sequence) to Ia (luminous supergiant). Its spectrum shows prominent emission lines, but the spectrum is complicated by the appearance of sharp shell components to some of the spectral lines. The colour of the star as shown by the B-V and U-B colour indices is not consistent with an early B spectral class, leading to many estimates of its effective temperature that are much lower than expected for a B-class star.

References

B-type main-sequence stars
Be stars
Auriga (constellation)
BD+46 0989
Aurigae, 12
033988